Cleopatra is a brand of cigarettes currently owned and manufactured by the Eastern Tobacco Company in Egypt. The brand is one of the most popular cigarette brands in Egypt and is sold in nearly every country in Africa, as well as various countries in the Middle East and Asia.

Products
Cleopatra cigarettes come in the following varieties:
 Cleopatra Golden
 Cleopatra Lights
 Cleopatra Luxe
 Cleopatra Super Star
 Cleopatra Super Luxe

See also
 Tobacco smoking

References

Cigarette brands